This is a list of Azerbaijanis from Nagorno-Karabakh.

Prominent people from Shusha 
Mir Mohsun Navvab, artist and poet
Khurshidbanu Natavan, poet
Sadigjan, musician, inventor of the Azeri variety of tar
Gasim bey Zakir, poet
Khudadat bey Malik-Aslanov, scientist and politician
Najaf bey Vazirov, playwright and journalist
Bulbul, folk and opera singer
Bulbuljan, folk singer
Abulfat Aliyev, mugham singer
Abdurrahim Hagverdiyev, dramatist    
Yusif Vazir Chamanzaminli (12 September 1887 to 3 January 1943 in the GULAG, near Gorky, Russia), core author of the novel Ali and Nino, published under the pseudonym Kurban Said
Karim bey Mehmandarov, doctor and social activist
Khan Shushinski, folk singer
Shamsi Badalbeyli, theatre director and actor
 Suleyman Sani Akhundov, Azerbaijani playwright, journalist, children's author, and teacher (3 October 1875, Shusha – 29 March 1939, Baku) 
 Ahmad Agdamski, Azerbaijani opera singer, mugam singer and actor (5 January 1884, Shusha – 1 April 1954 Agdash)
 Soltan Hajibeyov, Azerbaijani composer and People's Artist of the USSR (5 May 1919 Shusha – 19 September 1974 Baku)
 Uzeyir Hajibeyov (1885–1948), founder of Azerbaijani composed music
 Jabbar Garyagdioglu, Azerbaijani folk singer (khananda) (31 March 1861  Shusha – 20 April 1944 Baku) 
 Seyid Shushinski, Azerbaijani folk singer (khananda) (12 April 1889, Horadiz – 1 November 1965, Baku)
 Mir Hasan Vazirov, Azerbaijani revolutioner and one of the 26 Baku Commissars
 Latif Karimov, Azerbaijani carpet designer known for his contributions to a variety of artistic fields.(17 November 1906, Shusha – 1991, Baku)
 Mehdigulu Khan Vefa, lyrical poet of Azerbaijan, lieutenant colonel in the Russian Army, son of a famous Karabakh poet Khurshidbanu Natavan (1855 Shusha – 1900 1900 Tiflis)

Prominent people from Stepanakert 
 Fakhraddin Manafov, actor

Prominent people from Hadrut 
 Javad Malik-Yeganov, politician

Nagorno-Karabakh
Azer
Azerbaijani